Nationality words link to articles with information on the nation's poetry or literature (for instance, Irish or France).

Events
June 12 – Gaisford Prize founded
September 27 – Alfred Tennyson reads from his new book Maud and other poems at a social gathering in the home of Robert and Elizabeth Browning in London; Dante Gabriel Rossetti makes a sketch of him doing so
Belarusian writer Vintsent Dunin-Martsinkyevich publishes «Гапон» (Hapon) in the Russian Empire, the first poem written wholly in modern Belarusian.

Works published

Canada
 Charles Heavysege:
The Revolt of Tartarus, a poem in six parts (Montreal)
 Sonnets (Montreal: H. & G.M. Rose)

United Kingdom
 William Allingham, The Music-Master, illustrated by Arthur Hughes, Dante Gabriel Rossetti, and John Everett Millais
 Matthew Arnold, Poems, Second Series (see also Poems 1853) including Balder Dead
 Philip James Bailey, The Mystic, and Other Poems (see also Festus 1839)
 William Cox Bennett:
 Anti-Maud, "by a poet of the people"; parody of Alfred Lord Tennyson's Maud (see below)
 War Songs
 Robert Browning, Men and Women, including Childe Roland to the Dark Tower Came
 Edward Bulwer-Lytton, writing under the pen name "Owen Meredith", Clytemnestra; The Earl's Return; The Artist, and Other Poems
 Thomas Campbell, The Pleasures of Hope, with Other Poems (first published 1799), illustrated by Birket Foster, George Housman Thomas and Harrison Weir
 Sydney Dobell, writing under the pen name "S. Yendeys", and Alexander Smith, Sonnets on the War
 Leigh Hunt, Stories in Verse, a collection of his narrative poems, original and translated
 George MacDonald, Within and Without, the author's first published book
 Louisa Shore, War Lyrics
 Alfred Tennyson, Maud and other poems, including The Charge of the Light Brigade (first published in a periodical in 1854), Ode on the Death of the Duke of Wellington 1852 (see also William Cox Bennett's Anti-Maud parody, above)
 Catherine Winkworth, Lyra Germanica, first series, a popular translation of Versuch eines allgemeinen evangelischen Gesang- und Gebetbuchs by Christian Karl Josias, Freiherr von Busen (second series published in 1858)

United States
 Thomas Bailey Aldrich, The Bells: A Collection of Chimes
 Augustine Joseph Hickey Duganne, Poetical Works, posthumously published
 Henry Wadsworth Longfellow, The Song of Hiawatha, a very popular poem, often satirized from within days of its publication through the 20th century
 Bayard Taylor:
 Poems of the Orient
 Poems of Home and Travel
 Lucy Terry, first known African American poet, "Bars Fight, August 28, 1746", a ballad, posthumously published 
 Walt Whitman, Leaves of Grass, the first edition, July 4; Whitman would make many revisions in succeeding editions

Other
 Christian Winther, Hjortens Flugt ("The Flight of the Hart"); Denmark

Births
Death years link to the corresponding "[year] in poetry" article:
 May 1 – Marie Corelli (Mary Mackay) (died 1924), English novelist
 May 21 – Emile Verhaeren (died  1916), Belgian French
 August 3 – Henry Cuyler Bunner (died 1896), American
 September 12 – William Sharp (died 1905), Scottish poet writing as "Fiona Macleod"
 December 15 – Maurice Bouchor (died  1929), French
 December 28 – Juan Zorrilla de San Martín (died 1931), Uruguayan
 Date not known:
 Devendranath Sen (died 1920), Indian, Bengali-language poet
 Govardhanram N. Tripathi (died 1907), Indian, Gujarati-language novelist and poet
 Alexander Young, Scottish

Deaths

Birth years link to the corresponding "[year] in poetry" article:
 January 3 – János Majláth (born 1786), Hungarian
 January 10 – Mary Russell Mitford (born 1787), English writer
 January 25 – Dorothy Wordsworth (born 1771), English diarist and companion to her poet brother William
 January 26 – Gérard de Nerval (born 1808), French
 March 31 – Charlotte Brontë (born 1816), English novelist and poet
 April 6 – Robert Davidson (born 1778), Scottish peasant poet
 June 29 – Delphine de Girardin (born 1804), French writer
 July 6 – Andrew Crosse (born 1784), English 'gentleman scientist' and poet
 November 26 – Adam Mickiewicz (born 1798), Polish Romantic, dies in Istanbul while organizing Polish and Jewish volunteers to fight against Russia in the Crimean War
 December 3 – Robert Montgomery (born 1807), English
 December 18 – Samuel Rogers (born 1763), English
Date not known
 Mahmud Gami (born 1765), Indian, Kashmiri
 Sunthorn Phu (born 1786), Thai

See also

 19th century in poetry
 19th century in literature
 List of years in poetry
 List of years in literature
 Victorian literature
 French literature of the 19th century
 Poetry

Notes

19th-century poetry
Poetry